Oberbarnim is a municipality in the district Märkisch-Oderland, in Brandenburg, Germany.

The municipality is situated largely in the Märkische Schweiz Nature Park and consists of the following quarters (German: Ortsteile):

 Bollersdorf
 Pritzhagen (with Tornow)
 Grunow (with Ernsthof) 
 Klosterdorf
 Ihlow.

Demography

References

External links

Localities in Märkisch-Oderland